Trewarthenick is a hamlet in the civil parish of Tregoney in Cornwall, England, United Kingdom.

Trewarthenick lies within the Cornwall Area of Outstanding Natural Beauty (AONB). Almost a third of Cornwall has AONB designation, with the same status and protection as a National Park.

William Gregor, the discoverer of titanium, was born on the Trewarthenick Estate as was his brother Francis Gregor, MP for the County of Cornwall from 1790 to 1806.

Map sources
Map resources for Trewarthenick at

References

Hamlets in Cornwall